Amadi is a surname. Notable people with the surname include:

 Bethel Nnaemeka Amadi (1964–2019), Nigerian politician
 Chinaza Amadi (born 1987), Nigerian long jumper
 Derick Amadi (born 1984), Nigerian footballer
 Elechi Amadi (1934–2016), Nigerian author
 Ferdinand Amadi (born 1971), Central African athlete
 Ike Amadi, Nigerian-American voice actor
 Nonso Amadi (born 1995), Nigerian singer/songwriter
 Okey Amadi, Nigerian politician
 Ronnie Amadi (born 1981), Canadian and Arena football player
 Ugo Amadi (born 1997), American football player